The O. Ö. Energiesparverband is the energy agency of Upper Austria. It was set up by the regional government in 1991 to promote energy efficiency, renewable energy sources and innovative energy technologies located in Linz/Austria. Main target groups are private households, public bodies (e.g. municipalities) and businesses. The energy agency in active on local, national, EU and international levels with numerous projects and programmes.

The O. Ö. Energiesparverband supports the market development of sustainable energy production and use with the following programmes and projects:
 Energy information and public awareness
 Energy advice and auditing for households, public bodies and businesses
 Sustainable buildings programmes
 Training
 Management of the green energy business network Oekoenergie-Cluster
 Regional R&D programme
 Energy Performance Contracting Programme
 Local energy strategies
 European projects, international cooperation

References

External links
 O. Ö. Energiesparverband

Government of Austria
Renewable energy policy
Economy of Upper Austria